Eugene Harold Leek (born July 15, 1936 in San Diego, California) is an American former professional baseball player who appeared in 77 Major League Baseball games over three seasons for the Cleveland Indians and Los Angeles Angels (–62).

Leek graduated from San Diego's Hoover High School — alma mater of Hall of Famer Ted Williams — and attended the University of Arizona. He jumped right from the Arizona campus to the Indians, and in his first MLB game, on April 22, 1959, Leek had two hits in four at bats in a 10–1 victory over the Detroit Tigers, including his first professional home run, a two-run shot off George Susce Jr. He cooled off thereafter and was sent to the minor leagues in May, spending part of the season with his hometown San Diego Padres, then in the Triple-A Pacific Coast League. He was recalled by the Indians in September, and started four more games at third base, but he then spent all of 1960 in the minors and was selected by the first-year Angels in the 1960 Major League Baseball expansion draft.

He spent the first three months of the 1961 season on the Angels' roster, starting 48 games at third base before being sent back to the Pacific Coast League.  Injured during 1962, he appeared in only seven games for the Angels at the tail end of the season, then spent the rest of his career in the minors, retiring in 1968.

As a Major Leaguer, Leek collected 55 hits, including five doubles and one triple.

References

External links

1936 births
Living people
Arizona Wildcats baseball players
Baseball players from San Diego
Cleveland Indians players
El Paso Sun Kings players
High Point-Thomasville Hi-Toms players
Indianapolis Indians players
Los Angeles Angels players
Lynchburg White Sox players
Major League Baseball third basemen
Mobile Bears players
Portland Beavers players
Reading Phillies players
San Diego Padres (minor league) players
Seattle Angels players
Spokane Indians players
York White Roses players